La Gran Señora en Vivo is a live album released by Regional Mexican singer Jenni Rivera. It was recorded at the Nokia Theater in Los Angeles, California and released on November 22, 2010. La Gran Señora en Vivo earned Rivera a nomination for the Best Banda Album at the 12th Annual Latin Grammy Awards.

Track listing
 Mi Vida Loca 2 - Banda
 ¿Cuanto Te Debo? - Banda
 Cuando Me Acuerdo de Ti - Banda
 Tú Camisa Puesta - Banda
 Chuper Amigos - Banda
 Dama Divina - Banda
 Ni Me Viene, Ni Me Va - Banda
 Como Tu Mujer - Mariachi
 ¿Por Qué No le Calas? - Mariachi
 La Gran Señora - Mariachi
 Ya Lo Sé - Mariachi
 ¿Qué Me Vas a Dar? - Banda
 Inolvidable - Banda
 Mudanzas - Banda
 Él (banda version)
 Él (album version)

Charts

Weekly charts

Year-end charts

Sales and certifications

References

2010 live albums
Jenni Rivera live albums
Fonovisa Records live albums
Spanish-language live albums
Jenni Rivera video albums
Fonovisa Records video albums